The 1999–2000 NBA season was the 12th season for the Charlotte Hornets in the National Basketball Association. Despite finishing the previous season with a 26–24 record, the Hornets had the third overall pick in the 1999 NBA draft, and selected UCLA point guard Baron Davis, and signed undrafted rookie forward Eddie Robinson during the off-season. The Hornets got off to a solid 16–7 start, posting an 8-game winning streak in December. However, tragedy struck on January 12, 2000, when guard Bobby Phills was killed in a car accident while racing with teammate David Wesley after a team practice; Wesley also had a suspended driver's license at the time. The Hornets retired Phills' #13 jersey on February 9 during a game against his former team, the Cleveland Cavaliers; the team also wore a patch bearing his #13 on their jerseys for the remainder of the season. Phills played a sixth man role this season, averaging 13.6 points and 1.5 steals per game off the bench in 28 games, starting in just nine of them before his death at the age of 30.

Despite the loss of Phills, and a 7-game losing streak between December and January, the Hornets were competitive and finished the first half of the season strong with a respectable 27–20 record, as Eddie Jones was selected for the 2000 NBA All-Star Game. At midseason, the team acquired Dale Ellis from the Milwaukee Bucks, and re-signed free agent Chucky Brown after a brief stint with the San Antonio Spurs. The Hornets won their final seven games finishing second in the Central Division with a 49–33 record, and qualified for their fifth playoff appearance.

Jones averaged 20.1 points and 2.7 steals per game, and was named to the All-NBA Third Team, and to the NBA All-Defensive Second Team, while Derrick Coleman averaged 16.7 points, 8.5 rebounds and 1.8 blocks per game, and Wesley provided the team with 13.6 points and 5.6 assists per game. In addition, Elden Campbell provided with 12.7 points, 7.6 rebounds and 1.9 blocks per game, and Anthony Mason contributed 11.6 points and 8.5 rebounds per game. Off the bench, second-year center Brad Miller averaged 7.7 points and 5.3 rebounds per game, while Robinson contributed 7.0 points per game, and Davis provided with 5.9 points, 3.8 assists and 1.2 assists per game. Jones also finished tied in third place in Defensive Player of the Year voting.

In the playoffs, the Hornets faced the 5th-seeded Philadelphia 76ers in the Eastern Conference First Round, but were eliminated three games to one. The Hornets finished eleventh in the NBA in home-game attendance for the season. Following the season, Jones, Mason and second-year guard Ricky Davis were all traded to the Miami Heat, while Miller signed as a free agent with the Chicago Bulls, and Brown was released to free agency. Ellis, who was involved in a trade with the Heat, was released and then retired.

Offseason

NBA Draft

Roster

Roster Notes
 Shooting guard Bobby Phills died in a car accident on January 12.

Regular season

Season standings

Record vs. opponents

Playoffs

|- bgcolor=ffcccc
| 1
| April 22
| Philadelphia
| L 82–92
| Derrick Coleman (23)
| Derrick Coleman (16)
| David Wesley (4)
| Charlotte Coliseum15,023
| 0–1
|- bgcolor=ccffcc
| 2
| April 24
| Philadelphia
| W 108–98 (OT)
| Derrick Coleman (29)
| Elden Campbell (14)
| Eddie Jones (8)
| Charlotte Coliseum11,686
| 1–1
|- bgcolor=ffcccc
| 3
| April 28
| @ Philadelphia
| L 76–81
| Eddie Jones (18)
| Derrick Coleman (17)
| Anthony Mason (7)
| First Union Center20,849
| 1–2
|- bgcolor=ffcccc
| 4
| May 1
| @ Philadelphia
| L 99–105
| Campbell, Mason (21)
| Campbell, Coleman (11)
| Matt Geiger (10)
| First Union Center20,712
| 1–3
|-

Player statistics

Season

Playoffs

Awards and records
 Eddie Jones, All-NBA Third Team
 Eddie Jones, NBA All-Defensive Second Team

Transactions
 August 17, 1999

Signed Eddie Robinson as a free agent.
 August 18, 1999

Signed Todd Fuller as a free agent.
 October 4, 1999

Signed Derek Hood as a free agent.

Signed Jason Miskiri as a free agent.
 November 8, 1999

Waived Jason Miskiri.
 November 9, 1999

Signed Michael Hawkins as a free agent.
 November 23, 1999

Waived Derek Hood.
 January 18, 2000

Traded a 2000 2nd round draft pick (Jason Hart was later selected) and a 2002 2nd round draft pick (Chris Owens was later selected) to the Milwaukee Bucks for Dale Ellis.
 February 8, 2000

Signed Chucky Brown as a free agent.

Player Transactions Citation:

References

Charlotte Hornets seasons
Charlotte
Bob
Bob